Richard Hislop was a former association football player who represented New Zealand at international level.

Hislop played two official A-international matches for the All Whites in 1927, both against the touring Canadians, the first a 2–2 draw in which Hislop and Bob Innes were New Zealand's scorers on 25 June 1927, the second a 1–2 loss on 2 July.

References 

Year of birth missing
Year of death missing
New Zealand association footballers
New Zealand international footballers
Association footballers not categorized by position